Pasumarru may refer to any of the two villages in Andhra Pradesh, India:

 Pasumarru, Guntur district
 Pasumarru, Krishna District